Robert Butler (born 19 June 1967) is a British Conservative Party politician who has been Member of Parliament (MP) for Aylesbury since the 2019 general election. He served as Parliamentary Under-Secretary of State for Prisons and Probations between September and October 2022.

Early life
Butler was born in Aylesbury, Buckinghamshire. His earliest years were spent in Bedgrove, until his family moved to Bicester. He attended the University of Sheffield, where he studied French and Economics.

Early career
Butler's professional life began as a TV presenter at the BBC and later Channel 5, where he presented that channel's lunchtime news from its launch in 1997 until the end of 2004. In 2005, he founded a communication and lobbying consultancy, which worked with large and small companies around the world, such as the private healthcare company Bupa.

In 2010, he joined the lobbying firm Pagefield at its launch, as an associate partner and he was still listed as a specialist partner in their senior advisory team at the time of the 2019 election. During that time Pagefield worked with many clients including tobacco giants British American Tobacco, Philip Morris International, arms manufacturer and systems advisors BAE Systems, and the government of Azerbaijan, while its sister company Pagefield Global Counsel provides public relations services to clients such as the kingdom of Saudi Arabia in relation to the Saudi Arabian-led intervention in Yemen.

Prior to his election to Parliament, Butler was also a director of His Majesty's Prison and Probation Service.

Parliamentary career
Along with every Conservative candidate standing at the 2019 general election, Butler signed a personal pledge to support party leader Boris Johnson's Withdrawal Agreement. The MPs' pledges and the "oven-ready" Brexit deal were central tenets of the Conservative election campaign. In 2019, Butler was elected to succeed Sir David Lidington as MP for Aylesbury, a safe seat for the Conservative Party since 1929.

While never opposing it in votes or other action, Butler has criticised the HS2 project in words, calling it an "unwanted and ludicrously expensive railway". Butler has served on the Justice Select Committee since March 2020 and is a member of the Armed Forces Parliamentary Scheme for 2020 to 2022.

On 13 June 2022, Butler was appointed Parliamentary Private Secretary to Liz Truss, the secretary of state for foreign, Commonwealth and development affairs. He resigned this position on 7 July 2022 amid the July 2022 United Kingdom government crisis.

References

External links

1967 births
British broadcaster-politicians
Living people
UK MPs 2019–present
Conservative Party (UK) MPs for English constituencies
People from Aylesbury
People from Bicester
British television presenters
Alumni of the University of Sheffield